Amboasary Sud (Amboasary Atsimo) is a district located in Anosy Region, Madagascar. It has a population of 45,989 in 2018.

Geography 
It is located at the Mandrare River, approximately 75 km from Fort-Dauphin and 35 km from Ambovombe.

Economy
The economy of the town is dominated by sisal plantations and 3 transforming companies.

Points of interest
The privately owned Berenty Reserve is close to Amobasary.
 Bay of Italy (Italy significates Where there is the wind in Malgache language)
 Anony Lake with its flamingoes and the caves called Jurassique Cirque (Jurassic Circus).

Communes
The district is further divided into 14 communes:

 Amboasary Sud
 Behara
 Ebelo
 Elonty
 Esira
 Ifotaka
 Mahaly
 Manevy
 Maromby
 Marotsiraka
 Sampona
 Tanandava Sud
 Tranomaro
 Tsivory

References

External links
 Dilag-tours.ch - Madagaskar Lexikon (in French)

Populated places in Anosy

Anosy